Alcetas I (390/385 – 370 BC) was a king of Epirus, the son of Tharrhypas.

Biography
Alcetas was expelled from his kingdom for unknown reasons, and took refuge with  Dionysius I of Syracuse, by whom he was reinstated.
 
After Alcetas' restoration, he allied with the Athenians, and with Jason of Pherae, the Tagus of Thessaly. In 373 he appeared at Athens with Jason, for the purpose of defending the Athenian general Timotheus, who, through their influence, was acquitted. 

Upon Alcetas' death, the kingdom was divided between his two sons, Neoptolemus I and Arybbas.

References
Pausanias (i. 11. § 3).
Demosthenes  against Timotheus (pp. 1187, 1190).
Diodorus (xv. 13. 36.).

Sources

Rulers of Ancient Epirus
4th-century BC Greek people
4th-century BC rulers